The 1992 Beach Blast was the inaugural Beach Blast professional wrestling pay-per-view event produced by World Championship Wrestling (WCW). It took place on June 20, 1992 in the Mobile Civic Center in Mobile, Alabama.

The show included two main events: Ricky Steamboat and Rick Rude  faced off in a 30-minute Iron Man Challenge as the culmination of a long running feud, and The Steiner Brothers defended their WCW World Tag Team Championship against Terry Gordy and Steve Williams. In 2014, All WCW pay-per-views were made available on the WWE Network.

Production

Background
In 1992 the Atlanta, Georgia based World Championship Wrestling (WCW) professional wrestling promotion increased their pay-per-view (PPV) shows from six in 1991 to seven in 1992. As part of the expansion WCW came up with the concept of "Beach Blast". As part of the show's beach theme the Mobile Civic Center was decked out like a beach, complete with sand dunes around the entrance. surfboards and other surfing images.

The show took place only four days after WCW held Clash of the Champions XIX, free to cable subscribers.

The show was one of the first major events held after Bill Watts had been put in charge of WCW and would be the first show where a number of Watts' new rules would be enforced, including any move that included jumping off the top rope would result in a disqualification.

Storylines
The event featured wrestlers from pre-existing scripted feuds and storylines. Wrestlers portrayed villains, heroes, or less distinguishable characters in the scripted events that built tension and culminated in a wrestling match or series of matches.

Results

Availability on the WWE Network

WCW closed in 2001 and all rights to their television and PPV shows was bought by WWE, including the Beach Blast shows. With the launch of the WWE Network in 2014 the 1992 Beach Blast show became available on demand for network subscribers. Due to copyright concerns some of the theme songs originally used were initially replaced with generic music, notably the entrance music for Sting and The Steiner Brothers composed by Jimmy Papa. In March 2014, WWE restored the original music after an unsuccessful lawsuit by the composer.

References

1992 in Alabama
Professional wrestling in Alabama
Beach Blast
Events in Mobile, Alabama
June 1992 events in the United States
1992 World Championship Wrestling pay-per-view events